Citharinops distichodoides is a species of lutefish found in tropical Africa.  It is the only member of its genus and consists of two recognized subspecies"
 C. d. distichodoides (Pellegrin, 1919)
 C. d. thomasi (Pellegrin, 1924)

References
 

Characiformes
Monotypic fish genera
Fish of Africa
Taxa named by Jacques Pellegrin
Fish described in 1919